The 1959–60 Cypriot Second Division was the sixth season of the Cypriot second-level football league. Alki Larnaca FC won their 1st title.

Format
Nine teams participated in the 1959–60 Cypriot Second Division. The league was split to two geographical groups, depending from Districts of Cyprus each participated team came from. All teams of a group played against each other twice, once at their home and once away. The team with the most points at the end of the season crowned group champions. The winners of each group were playing against each other in the final phase of the competition and the winner were the champions of the Second Division.

Teams received two points for a win, one point for a draw and zero points for a loss.

Stadiums and locations

Nicosia-Keryneia-Famagusta Group
Group champions was Enosis Agion Omologiton.

Limassol-Larnaca-Paphos Group 
Group champions was Alki Larnaca FC.

Champions Playoff 
Enosis Agion Omologiton 1–6 Alki Larnaca FC (June 26, 1960, GSP Stadium (1902))
Alki Larnaca FC 3–4 Enosis Agion Omologiton (June 29, 1960, GSZ Stadium (1928))

Alki Larnaca FC were the champions of the Second Division. Alki Larnaca FC promoted to Cypriot First Division after promotion playoffs with Aris Limassol FC.

See also
 Cypriot Second Division
 1959–60 Cypriot First Division

References

Cypriot Second Division seasons
Cyprus
1959–60 in Cypriot football